Baron Tredegar, of Tredegar in the County of Monmouth, was a title in the Peerage of the United Kingdom. It was created on 16 April 1859 for the Welsh politician Sir Charles Morgan, 3rd Baronet, who had earlier represented Brecon in Parliament. His eldest son, Charles Rodney Morgan, sat as Member of Parliament for Brecon, but predeceased his father. Lord Tredegar was therefore succeeded by his second son, the second Baron.

Barons Tredegar

Charles Morgan was a politician and soldier, and notably commanded a section of the Light Brigade at the Battle of Balaclava during the Crimean War. Godfrey was 22 and Captain in the 17th Lancers. His horse, Sir Briggs, also survived, and lived at Tredegar House until his death at the age of 28. He was buried with full military honours in the Cedar Garden at the House. The monument still stands there today.

On 28 December 1905 he was created Viscount Tredegar, of Tredegar in the County of Monmouth, in the Peerage of the United Kingdom. He never married and the viscountcy became extinct on his death in 1913. He was succeeded in the baronetcy and barony by his nephew, Courtenay, the third Baron. He was the eldest son of the Hon. Frederick Courtenay Morgan, third son of the first Baron. On 4 August 1926 the viscountcy was revived when he was created Viscount Tredegar, of Tredegar in the County of Monmouth, in the Peerage of the United Kingdom. Lord Tredegar subsequently served as Lord-Lieutenant of Monmouthshire.

He was succeeded by his only son, the second Viscount. He was a poet and well-known eccentric. Lord Tredegar was childless and the viscountcy became extinct on his death in 1949. He was succeeded in the baronetcy and barony by his uncle, the fifth Baron. He was a younger son of the aforementioned the Hon. Frederick Courtenay Morgan. On his death the titles passed to his son, the sixth Baron. When the sixth Baron died in 1962 the baronetcy and barony became extinct as well.

History of the Morgan family
The Morgan family descended from William Morgan, Member of Parliament for Monmouthshire. His eldest son Thomas Morgan was Member of Parliament for Brecon and Monmouthshire. All Thomas's children predeceased him and he left his estates to his younger brother John Morgan (1670-1720), who sat as Member of Parliament for Monmouthshire and served as Lord-Lieutenant of Breconshire and Monmouthshire. John also succeeded to the estate of his uncle and namesake, John Morgan (d. 1715), High Sheriff of Monmouthshire in 1697 and Member of Parliament for Monmouth, a merchant who had amassed a great fortune in London.

John's eldest son Sir William Morgan was Member of Parliament for Monmouthshire from 1722 to 1731. William's eldest son William Morgan sat as Member of Parliament for Monmouthshire from 1747 to 1763. His uncle Thomas Morgan (the son of John Morgan), known as "the General", was Member of Parliament for Brecon, Monmouthshire and Breconshire and served as Judge Advocate General from 1741 to 1768. His eldest son Thomas Morgan was Member of Parliament for Brecon and Monmouthshire. His younger brother Charles Morgan sat as Member of Parliament for Brecon and Breconshire. His younger brother John Morgan of Dderw was Member of Parliament for Brecon and Monmouthshire. On his death the male line of the Morgan family failed. His sister and heiress Jane Morgan married Charles Gould. He sat as Member of Parliament for Brecon and Breconshire and served as Judge Advocate General from 1768 to 1806. He was knighted in 1779 and created a baronet, of Tredegar in the County of Monmouth, in the Baronetage of Great Britain on 30 October 1792.

The day after his elevation to a baronetcy he assumed by Royal licence the surname of Morgan in lieu of his patronymic. He was succeeded by his eldest son, the second Baronet. He was a Lieutenant-General in the British Army and served as Commander-in-Chief of the West Indies. He was succeeded by his eldest son, the aforementioned third Baronet, who was elevated to the peerage in 1859. See above for further history of the baronetcy.

Octavius Morgan, fourth son of the second Baronet, was a politician, historian and antiquary.

Title holders

Morgan baronets, of Tredegar (1792)
Sir Charles Gould Morgan, 1st Baronet (1726–1806)
Sir Charles Morgan, 2nd Baronet (1760–1846)
Sir Charles Morgan Robinson Morgan, 3rd Baronet (1792–1875) (created Baron Tredegar in 1859)

Baron Tredegar (1859)
Charles Morgan Robinson Morgan, 1st Baron Tredegar (1792–1875)
Godfrey Charles Morgan, 2nd Baron Tredegar (1830–1913) (created Viscount Tredegar in 1905)

Viscounts Tredegar; First creation (1905)
Godfrey Charles Morgan, 1st Viscount Tredegar (1830–1913)

Baron Tredegar (1859; Reverted)
Courtenay Charles Evan Morgan, 3rd Baron Tredegar (1867–1934) (created Viscount Tredegar in 1926)

Viscounts Tredegar; Second creation (1926)
Courtenay Charles Evan Morgan, 1st Viscount Tredegar (1867–1934)
Evan Frederick Morgan, 2nd Viscount Tredegar (1893–1949)

Baron Tredegar (1859; reverted)
Frederick George Morgan, 5th Baron Tredegar (1873–1954)
Frederick Charles John Morgan, 6th Baron Tredegar (1908–1962)

See also
 Tredegarville

References

External links

Tredegar
Extinct baronies in the Peerage of the United Kingdom
Noble titles created in 1859
Noble titles created for UK MPs